X-Plane Airliner is a game for the iOS and webOS developed and published by Laminar Research.

Gameplay
X-Plane Airliner is a simulation game. It plays similarly to Microsoft Flight Simulator, except with fewer aircraft. The aircraft is controlled by motion power, with the use of the iPod touch/iPhone inbuilt accelerometer.

Aircraft
Boeing 777
Boeing 747
Boeing 787 Dreamliner
Airbus A380
McDonnell Douglas MD-80
Boeing 737
Boeing 757
Airbus A320

Differences
Both versions share all the same flight controls, the same graphics, the same interface, and so on. The only noticeable difference is the loading screen.

References 

IOS games